John Ringling Causeway (also known as Ringling Bridge or Gil Waters Bridge) is a bridge that extends past the Sarasota Bay, from Sarasota to St. Armands Key and Lido Key.  The  bridge, built in 2003, is a segmental box girder bridge named after John Ringling, one of the founders of the Ringling Brothers Circus and resident of the Sarasota area.

History
The first bridge was built in 1925 by John Ringling, who owned large tracts of land on both Lido and Longboat Keys. The ornate bridge opened for traffic on February 7, 1926 and was labelled "one of the greatest engineering accomplishments in the South” by the Sarasota Herald, which also proclaimed “There are no words adequate with which to express our appreciation.” Ringling donated the bridge to the city in 1927.

Around 1950, the first bridge began to show that it could not adequately handle increased traffic to the islands. In 1951, the State Road Department opted to replace the bridge with a four-lane drawbridge, which was completed and opened to traffic in 1959. The drawbridge was built at a cost of $20 million and the original bridge was demolished.

Around 2000, the drawbridge began to suffer the same fate as its predecessor. With the drawbridge opening as many as 18 times a day, it was unable to handle increasing amounts of traffic. To remedy the situation, construction began on the current high-span bridge in 2001. Landscaping around the bridge was financed by private donors.

References

Road bridges in Florida
Bridges completed in 2003
1925 establishments in Florida
Box girder bridges in the United States
Transportation buildings and structures in Sarasota County, Florida